Innocent Prey is an Australian erotic thriller film which was shot in 1984 but was released in 1991.

Plot
Cathy Willis arrives home in Dallas to find her husband, Joe, has just murdered a hooker and is arrested and committed to an insane asylum. After he escapes, Cathy flees to Australia and lives with her friend Gwen. Unfortunately, Cathy's safety is at stake since Gwen's landlord spies on his residents through hidden surveillance cameras.

Cast
 P.J. Soles as Cathy Wills
 Kit Taylor as Joe
 Grigor Taylor as Rick
 John Warnock as Phillip
 Susan Stenmark as Gwen
 Richard Morgan as Ted
 Martin Balsam as Sheriff Virgil Baker
 Debi Sue Voorhees as a hooker

Production
The film was shot in Sydney and Dallas under the title of Voyeur.

References

External links
 
 Innocent Prey at Oz Movies
 Innocent Prey at AustLit

1983 films
Australian horror thriller films
1983 horror films
Films directed by Colin Eggleston
Films scored by Brian May (composer)
Australian slasher films
1980s slasher films
1980s horror thriller films
1980s English-language films
1980s Australian films